Ron Wallace may refer to:
Ron Wallace (poet), American poet and Professor of Poetry and English at the University of Wisconsin-Madison
Ron Wallace (singer), American country music singer